Geraldine Page (November 22, 1924June 13, 1987) was an American film, stage, and television actress. Over the course of her career, she earned seven Academy Awards nominations, before winning the award for Best Actress for her performance in The Trip to Bountiful (1985). Among her numerous awards and nominations, she earned two Golden Globe Awards and four Tony Award nominations.

Academy Awards

British Academy Film Awards

David di Donatello Awards

Golden Globe Awards

Independent Spirit Awards

Laurel Awards

National Board of Review

Primetime Emmy Awards

Tony Awards

Venice Film Festival

Critics' awards

Boston Society of Film Critics

Kansas City Film Critics Circle

Los Angeles Film Critics Association

New York Film Critics Circle

Notes

References

Works cited

Page, Geraldine